Luis Telmo Paz y Miño Estrella (15 April 1884–1962), more commonly known as Telmo Paz y Miño, was President of the Supreme Military Junta of Ecuador in July 1925.

Born in the then-rural parroquia of Chillogallo, in Quito, Ecuador, Gen. Paz y Miño entered military school in 1902.

He held various military and political positions, as well as having been rector of an educational institute. He also wrote various investigative works in geography, history and literature.

See also
 Pazmiño

External links
 Official Website of the Ecuadorian Government about the country President's History

1884 births
1962 deaths
People from Pichincha Province
Ecuadorian generals
Presidents of Ecuador